Demographics of Christianity refers to the characteristics of Christians worldwide.  More specifically, it may refer to:
 List of Christian denominations by number of members
 Christianity by country
 Christian population growth